USCGC Benjamin Dailey (WPC-1123) was the United States Coast Guard's 23rd  cutter.   She was the first cutter of her class stationed in the Coast Guard's Eight District, with a homeport in Pascagoula, Mississippi.

The vessel's manufacturer, Bollinger Shipyards, of Lockport, Louisiana, delivered the ship to the Coast Guard, in Key West, on April 20, 2017, for final outfitting and crew training.

USCGC Benjamin Dailey was commissioned at a ceremony held in Pascagoula, Mississippi on July 4, 2017.

Mission

The Sentinel-class cutters are lightly armed patrol vessels with a crew of approximately two dozen sailors, capable of traveling almost 3,000 nautical miles, on five-to-eight day missions. The cutter is a multi-mission vessel intended to perform law enforcement, search and rescue, fisheries and environmental protection, and homeland security tasks.

Namesake

In 2010, Charles "Skip" W. Bowen, who was then the United States Coast Guard's most senior non-commissioned officer, proposed that all 58 cutters in the Sentinel class should be named after enlisted sailors in the Coast Guard, or one of its precursor services, who were recognized for their heroism.  In 2014 the Coast Guard announced that Benjamin B. Dailey, keeper of the Cape Hatteras Lifesaving Station, would be the namesake of the 23rd cutter.

Dailey, and the crew of Life Saving Service surfmen he commanded, had rescued nine crewmen from the wreck of the Ephraim Williams, and were awarded the Gold Life Saving Medal.

Operational history

Shortly after being commissioned, Benjamin Dailey deployed on behalf of her operational commander, the Eighth Coast Guard District, conducting counter-narcotics, fisheries enforcement, and border security off southern Texas. In August 2017, the ship provided rescue and assistance for Houston after Hurricane Harvey struck the city.
In May 2018, Benjamin Dailey participated in GOMEX 2018, a five-day exercise between the U.S. Coast Guard, the Royal Canadian Navy, and the Mexican Navy in Tampico, Mexico.

On December 10, 2021, the ship was heavily damaged during a fire while in drydock in Tampa, Florida. The vessel was subsequently decommissioned and placed into inactive reserve at the Beaumont Reserve Fleet in Beaumont, Texas on September 6th, 2022.

References

Sentinel-class cutters
Ships of the United States Coast Guard
2017 ships
Ships built in Lockport, Louisiana